Hari Sen (born 15 August 1955) is an academic historian from Himachal Pradesh, India. He is a former teacher of history at Delhi University and conducted research on the Bhils of colonial Rajasthan. He is also the current titular Raja of the erstwhile princely state of Suket.

Personal life 
Hari Sen was born in 1955 in the royal family of Suket, an erstwhile 11-gun salute princely state whose capital used to be the present-day town of Sundar Nagar in Himachal Pradesh. Sen's father was Lalit Sen (b.1932 - d.1985) - a two-time member of parliament from the Mandi constituency - and his paternal grandfather was Raja Lakshman Sen Bahadur (b.1895 - d.1970), the last ruling king of Suket. Sen's mother is Krishna Kumari, daughter of Maharawal Sir Lakshman Singh (the last ruling king of Dungarpur) from his second wife. Sen nominally succeeded to the 'gaddi' (throne) of Suket on 18 October 1985, as the 52nd 'Raja Saheb' of Suket. His nominal title is His Highness Raja Hari Sen Bahadur of Suket. Sen is married to Dr. Radhika Chopra, a renowned Indian sociologist who is also the daughter of the journalist Pran Chopra. 

Sen is the trustee and president of the Maharaja Lakshman Sen Memorial College in Sundar Nagar.

Sen, who is a friend of the writer Amitav Ghosh, features prominently in Ghosh's often-reprinted essay about the 1984 anti-Sikh riots in Delhi, 'The Ghosts of Mrs Gandhi'.

Academic career

Education 
Sen did his schooling from St. Columba's School, Delhi, his MA in history from St. Stephen's College, Delhi University, and PhD from the Department of History, Delhi University. His PhD dissertation was titled Popular Protest in Mewar in the Late-Nineteenth and Early-Twentieth Centuries (unpublished,1996).

Teaching 
Sen taught history at Ramjas College, Delhi University, from October 1991 till his retirement in August 2020. He was widely known as a teacher of history at Delhi University. He has been mentioned as an influence in the works of several historians and other scholars of South Asia, including Ramchandra Guha (2000), Prakash Kumar (2012), Monika Saxena (2018), Pankaj Jha (2018), Radhika Chopra (2018), and Nikhil Menon (2022).

Bibliography

Book chapters 
 Sen, Hari. "The Bhil rebellion of 1881". In Issues in Modern Indian History: for Sumit Sarkar. Popular Prakashan, 2000.
 Sen, Hari. "The Bhils in Colonial Mewar." In Negotiating India’s Past: Essays in Memory of Partha Sarathi Gupta. Tulika Books, 2003.
 Sen, Hari. "The Maharana and the Bhils: The ‘Eki’ movement in Mewar, 1921–22." In India's Princely States, pp. 157-172. Routledge, 2007.

References 

People from Mandi district
Indian royalty
Scholars from Himachal Pradesh
1955 births
Academic staff of Delhi University
Delhi University alumni
Historians of India
Historians of colonialism
Historians of South Asia
St. Stephen's College, Delhi alumni
20th-century Indian historians
21st-century Indian historians
St. Columba's School, Delhi alumni
Living people